Jack Howard Hoffman (March 11, 1930 – December 13, 2001) was an American football defensive end who played five seasons with the Chicago Bears of the National Football League. He was drafted by the Chicago Bears in the fifth round of the 1952 NFL Draft. Hoffman graduated from Purcell Marian High School in Cincinnati, Ohio in 1948 and played college football at Xavier University, where he graduated with a bachelor degree in business in 1952. He missed the 1953 and 1954 seasons while serving in the United States Army during the Korean War era.

Hoffman spent his entire NFL career with the Bears, starting his entire rookie year. A stalwart on the Bears defensive line, he continued to play every game until he dislocated his elbow against the Green Bay Packers in 1958, leading to his retirement. He later became a car salesman in Cincinnati, with son Jack Jr. doing the same.

References

External links
Just Sports Stats

1930 births
2001 deaths
Players of American football from Cincinnati
American football defensive ends
Xavier Musketeers football players
Chicago Bears players
United States Army soldiers